Ibrat (formerly Yangiqoʻrgʻon) is an urban-type settlement in Fergana Region, Uzbekistan. It is the administrative center of Buvayda District. Its population was 7,502 people in 1989, and 8,500 in 2016.

References

Populated places in Fergana Region
Urban-type settlements in Uzbekistan